Kim Seo-yeong (born January 19, 1977) is a South Korean voice artist who started her career in 1999 at Munhwa Broadcasting Corporation, as an in-house voice artist. In 2002 she received attention in the South Korean entertainment district for her voice acting skills.

She has dubbed several main characters in mainstream animation and movies.

Career

TV commercial voice-over 
Kim performed over 1,000 TV commercials annually and over 10,000 pieces of work have been broadcast so far.

Awards 

 (2014) MBC Drama Awards : Consolation Medal
 (2004) Seoul International Cartoon and Animation Festival (SICAF) : Animation Consolation Medal

Portfolio

Dubbing

Film 
(2017) Desert of No Return

(2017) Beauty and the Beast - Belle (Emma Watson)

(2017) The Emoji Movie - Jailbreak

(2017) Smurfs: The Lost Village - Smurfette

(2017) Despicable Me 3 - Agnes

(2014) How to Train Your Dragon 2 - Astrid

(2013) Despicable Me 2 - Agnes

(2010) Despicable Me - Agnes

(2010) How to Train Your Dragon - Astrid

(2008) WALL-E - Eve

(2006) Hula Girls - Sanae by Yū Aoi

(2004) Crying Out Love, in the Centre of the World - Aki Hirose by Masami Nagasawa

(2002) The Bourne Identity - Marie Kreutz by Franka Potente

(2002) Harry Potter and the Chamber of Secrets - Ronald Weasley by Rupert Grint

(2001) Harry Potter and the Philosopher's Stone - Ronald Weasley by Rupert Grint

(2001) Lord of the Rings - Eowyn by Miranda Otto

(2001) Shallow Hal - Rosemary by Gwyneth Paltrow

(2000) Charlie's Angels - Alex Munday by Lucy Liu

(1993) The Heroic Trio - Chat by Maggie Cheung

TV series

(China) Legend of Lu Zhen - Lu Zhen by Zhao Liying

(USA) Prison Break - Maricruz Delgado by Camille Guaty

(USA) CSI: NY Season 4, 5 - Detective Jessica Angell by Emmanuelle Vaugier

(USA) 24 - Kimberly Bauer by Elisha Cuthbert

(USA) Smallville - Chloe Sullivan by Allison Mack

Animation

(Japan) Doraemon - Doraemon

(Japan) Bonobono - Bonobono

(Japan) Dr. Shyne Evangelista - Arale

(Japan) PriPara - Falulu, Jururu, Unicorn

(Japan) The Boy and The Beast - Kyuta

(Japan) Your Lie in April - Tsubaki

(Japan) Haikyu!! Talent and Sense - Hitoka Yachi

(Japan) Haikyu!! Concept no Tatakai - Hitoka Yachi

(Japan) Junji Ito Collection - Tomie

(Japan) Kaleido Star - Sora Naegino

(Japan) Sgt. Frog Keroro - Seol-hwa Kwon

(Japan) Fresh Pretty Cure! - Love Momozono/Cure Peach

(South Korea) Nalong/Nalong 2 - Nalong

Game character

Dota 2 - Announcer 
Dungeon Fighter Online - Knight 
Mushiking - Popo 
Halo
Heroes of the storm - Brightwing, Faerie Dragon
Star Craft 2 - Banshee

Electronic Device

 BMW Navigation
 LG cell phone

Discography

Animation OST
 Kaleido Star 
 Daniel Tiger's Neighbourhood 
 Daniel Tiger's Neighbourhood
 Dr. Slump ending song “You are here, I am here”
 The Backyarigans opening / ending song 
 Best Student Council opening song “Let’s love girls” 
 Best Student Council ending song “ Accidental Angel" 
 Naughty Ninja Tori opening song
 Love in Love opening song “Blooming Cherry blossom”
 Love in Love final ending song “Starting point”
 Tsurupika Hagemaru opening song
 Kaleido Star ending song  “Real identity”
 Teen Titans opening song
 Fruits Basket Ep16 “the Fall song”
 Bean and Wari opening song

Filmography

(2015) MBC Infinite Challenge : Ep.447 The film of the Weekend - Begin Again dubbing for Violet

On-Stage

Concert MC
(2017) ‘November Rain’ - The November love story told by voice artist Seo-young Kim (Collaboration of Japanese animation with Jazz)

(2017) ‘Classic detox concert with voice artist Seo-young Kim’ MC

(2017) ‘Orchestra story telling with Musical actor Kai and MBC voice artist Seo-young Kim ’ MC : Seo-san, Ul-san, Ga-pyeong, Busan National Tour

Theater
(2001) Eugène Ionesco ‘The lesson’ - Main student

See also
Munhwa Broadcasting Corporation
MBC Voice Acting Division

References

External links
Daum Cafe Voice Actor Kim Seo Yeong Homepage
MBC Voice Acting Division Kim Seo Yeong Blog

1977 births
Living people
People from Seoul
South Korean voice actresses